Progress M1-1 was a Progress spacecraft which was launched by Russia in 2000 to resupply the Mir space station. It was a Progress-M1 11F615A55 spacecraft, with the serial number 250. It was the first flight of the Progress-M1, a derivative of the Progress-M originally designed for resupplying the International Space Station, which was optimised for the transportation of fuel over pressurised cargo.

Progress M1-1 was launched by a Soyuz-U carrier rocket from Site 1/5 at the Baikonur Cosmodrome. Launch occurred at 06:47:23 GMT on 1 February 2000. The spacecraft docked with Mir, which was at that time uncrewed, at 08:02:28 GMT on 3 February – the docking port used was the aft port on the Kvant-1 module. It remained docked for 83 days before undocking at 16:32:43 GMT on 26 April to make way for Progress M1-2. It was deorbited at 19:26:03 GMT, and burned up in the atmosphere over the Pacific Ocean around fifty minutes later.

Progress M1-1 was used to reboost Mir, which was rapidly decaying from orbit at the time of its arrival. It carried nitrogen to repressurise the station following a leak, as well as supplies for the EO-28 crew, who arrived aboard Mir in April.

See also

2000 in spaceflight
List of Progress flights
List of uncrewed spaceflights to Mir

References

Spacecraft launched in 2000
Mir
Progress (spacecraft) missions